Kumsi  is a village in the southern state of Karnataka, India. It is located in the Shivamogga taluk of Shivamogga district in Karnataka.

Demographics
As of 2001 India census, Kumsi had a population of 6042 with 3069 males and 2973 females.

See also
 Shimoga
 Districts of Karnataka

References

External links
 http://Shimoga.nic.in/

Villages in Shimoga district